Beech Grove, also known as Beach Grove, is an unincorporated community in Jasper County, Texas.  It is located on U.S. Highway 190 about 6 miles from Jasper.  Its most recent population estimate is 75.

History 
A post office was established in 1890, so it can be presumed to have been founded at or before that year.  By the late 1890s, a local school was established. By the 1910s, it had a store and a cotton gin. the school was moved to Highway 190 in 1937. The post office was moved to Curtis in 1944.  It apparently was an incorporated town as late as 1986 as it had a town hall on that date.  The school still existed at that same period of time.

Education 
Jasper Independent School District serves area students.  Despite the small size of the town, Beech Grove still had a school as late as 1986.

References 

Unincorporated communities in Jasper County, Texas
Unincorporated communities in Texas